The 1940 Oklahoma Sooners football team represented the University of Oklahoma in the 1940 college football season. In their fourth year under head coach Tom Stidham, the Sooners compiled a 6–3 record (4–1 against conference opponents), finished in second place in the Big Six Conference, and outscored their opponents by a combined total of 121 to 105.

No Sooners received All-America honors in 1940, but four Sooners received all-conference honors: tackle Roger Eason, end Bill Jennings, guard Harold Lahar, and back John Martin.

Schedule

NFL Draft
The following players were drafted into the National Football League following the season.

References

Oklahoma
Oklahoma Sooners football seasons
Oklahoma Sooners football